The Mighty Boosh is a British comedy troupe featuring comedians Julian Barratt and Noel Fielding. Developed from three stage shows and a six-episode radio series, it has since spanned a total of 20 television episodes for BBC Three which aired from 2004 to 2007, and two live tours of the UK, as well as two live shows in the United States. The first television series is set in a zoo operated by Bob Fossil, the second in a flat and the third in a secondhand shop in Dalston called Nabootique.

Various members of The Mighty Boosh have appeared in a number of different comedy series including Nathan Barley, Snuff Box and Noel Fielding's Luxury Comedy, and regular Boosh collaborators included Richard Ayoade and Matt Berry. The troupe is named after a childhood hairstyle of co-star Michael Fielding.

History
Fielding first met Barratt after seeing him perform his solo stand-up routine at the Hellfire Comedy Club in the Wycombe Swan Theatre, in High Wycombe, Buckinghamshire. The pair soon found that they shared comic interests, formed a double act, and "decided to be the new Goodies". After their first performance together at a bar, De Hems, in London in April 1998, Barratt and Fielding developed their zookeeper characters – Howard Moon and Vince Noir, respectively – in a series of sketches for Paramount Comedy’s Unnatural Acts. Here they also met American Rich Fulcher, who became Bob Fossil. Fielding's friend Dave Brown and Fielding's brother Michael also became regular collaborators. Richard Ayoade was another original cast member, playing adventurer Dixon Bainbridge, but Matt Berry replaced him in the first television series, since Ayoade was under contract with Channel 4. Ayoade returned in the second and third series as a belligerent shaman named Saboo.
Noel Fielding and Michael Fielding have each separately stated that the name "Mighty Boosh" was originally a phrase used by a friend of Michael's to describe the hair that Michael had as a child.

The Boosh produced 3 stage shows – The Mighty Boosh (1998), Arctic Boosh (1999) and Autoboosh (2000) – all of which were taken to the Edinburgh Fringe. With the success of Autoboosh, a radio series was commissioned by the BBC. Produced by Danny Wallace, The Boosh was first broadcast in 2001 on BBC London Live, later transferring to BBC Radio 4, from which the team were given a half-hour television pilot of the same name.

The first 8-part series, directed by Paul King, was then commissioned for BBC Three and broadcast in 2004, with a second of 6 episodes the next year. The second series moved away from the zoo setting to show Howard, Vince, Naboo the shaman and Bollo the talking ape living in a flat in Dalston. In 2006, the Boosh returned to theatre with The Mighty Boosh Live, which featured a new story entitled "The Ruby of Kukundu".

After two years away from television, the Boosh returned in November 2007. Set in Naboo's second-hand shop below the flat, the third series drew approximately 1 million viewers with its first episode, and in light of its success, BBC Three broadcast an entire night of The Mighty Boosh on 22 March 2008, which included a new documentary and 6 of Barratt and Fielding's favourite episodes from all 3 series. J. G. Quintel has said that The Mighty Boosh was a large influence on his animated series Regular Show.

In June 2013, it was confirmed that The Mighty Boosh would reunite for a US festival called Festival Supreme in October 2013.

On 1 January 2020, Fielding posted an image of himself and Barratt on Instagram with the caption, "There really wasn't enough Boosh this decade ! let's try and rectify that in the next one ;) x".

Main cast
 Julian Barratt as Howard Moon
 Noel Fielding as Vince Noir
 Michael Fielding as Naboo
 Dave Brown as Bollo
 Rich Fulcher as Bob Fossil

The cast members also play smaller roles throughout the series, the roles listed above are their most frequently appearing characters. For a full list of characters, see the List of The Mighty Boosh characters.

Theatre

Original stage shows

The Mighty Boosh (1998)

The Boosh, then consisting of only Barratt and Fielding, conceived The Mighty Boosh whilst working on Stewart Lee's Edinburgh Festival show King Dong vs. Moby Dick in which they played a giant penis and a whale respectively.

In 1998, they took The Mighty Boosh to the Edinburgh Festival, recruiting fellow comedian Rich Fulcher, whom the pair had met while working on Unnatural Acts. The show won the Perrier Award for Best Newcomer. During their residency at North London's Hen and Chickens Theatre the following year, they built up a cult following, introducing new characters whilst developing old ones.

Arctic Boosh (1999)

In 1999, the Boosh returned to the Edinburgh Festival with a new show, Arctic Boosh, with Dave Brown acting as choreographer and photographer, as well as playing a variety of characters. Arctic Boosh sold out every night and was nominated for the Perrier Award. The show was directed by Stewart Lee.

Autoboosh (2000)

In 2000, the Boosh premiered their third stage show, Autoboosh, at the Melbourne International Comedy Festival, adding Fielding's younger brother Michael to the cast. Autoboosh won the festival's Barry Award.

Nationwide tours

The Mighty Boosh Live (2006)

The Boosh returned to the stage in 2006, touring the UK for the first time. Though drawing heavily from their earlier material, the main story combined these elements into a new narrative. A recording of this show at the Brixton Academy was later released on DVD, before being broadcast on BBC Three on Boxing Day, 2007.

The Mighty Boosh Live: Future Sailors Tour (2008/09)

The Boosh toured the UK and Ireland for a second time from September 2008 to February 2009.  The show featured characters from all three series as well as the Boosh Band.

They made appearances throughout the UK after their live shows, at after-parties held in different places in each city. The events were called "Outrage", after the catchphrase by Tony Harrison.

Radio

The Boosh (2001)

From the success of Autoboosh, the BBC commissioned a six-part radio series for the Boosh. In October 2001 The Boosh radio series, produced by Danny Wallace, was broadcast on BBC London Live, then BBC Radio 4, and later on BBC 7. The show focuses on the adventures of a pair of zookeepers at "Bob Fossil's Funworld": socially awkward, jazz enthusiast Howard TJ Moon, and ultra-vain, fashion-obsessed Vince Noir. This also included voices from Lee Mack, playing such characters as the Plumber or the Gardener.

Further appearances
The Mighty Boosh returned to radio on 22 October 2004, in a one-off comedy special for The Breezeblock, a show on BBC Radio 1. Instead of the plot driven nature of their own series, this show featured improvised conversational comedy with Barratt, Fielding and Fulcher, combined with the show's usual mix of electronic music.

On 15 November 2007, as part of the publicity for the premier of their third series the same day, Julian Barratt and Noel Fielding returned to Radio 1, this time on Jo Whiley's Live Lounge.

On 9 April 2019, it was announced that The Mighty Boosh will be the UK ambassadors for the Record Store Day at 13 April 2019, a show on BBC Radio 1.

Television

The Mighty Boosh (2004–07)

In May 2004, after the success of a Boosh pilot, Steve Coogan's company, Baby Cow Productions, produced the first television series of The Mighty Boosh for BBC Three, before it moved to BBC Two in November that same year. Though each episode invariably starts and ends in Dixon Bainbridge's dilapidated zoo, the "Zooniverse", the characters of Vince and Howard often depart for other locations, such as the Arctic tundra and limbo.

A second series, shown in July 2005, saw Howard and Vince sharing Naboo's flat in Dalston with previously minor characters Naboo and his familiar, Bollo, a gorilla living at the "Zooniverse". This series had an even looser setting as the four characters leave the confines of the flat in every episode, travelling in their van to a variety of surrealistic environments, including Naboo's home planet "Xooberon".

Series three started in November 2007, still set in Dalston, but this time the foursome are selling 'Bits & Bobs' in their shop, the Nabootique.  Their adventures and outings in this series focused more on the involvement of new characters (e.g. Sammy the Crab, or Lester Corncrake etc.) rather than just the two of them.

Although BBC America originally aired only series 1 in the U.S (all episodes in their entirety), The Mighty Boosh began airing in North America on Cartoon Network's Adult Swim block (with up to 6 minutes cut from each episode), starting 29 March 2009 with the third series. In February 2016 series 1 of The Mighty Boosh was made available to watch via the online service BBC iPlayer for six weeks; this included every episode minus the final episode of the first series 'Hitcher'.

The Mighty Boosh Night
On 22 March 2008, BBC Three broadcast a whole night of The Mighty Boosh from 9:05 pm, starting with a new documentary titled The Mighty Boosh: A Journey Through Time and Space, documenting the history of the Boosh from their first amateur performances to their then-upcoming 2008 tour. This was followed by six of Barratt and Fielding's favourite episodes from the three series: "Party", "The Power of the Crimp", "The Nightmare of Milky Joe", "The Priest and the Beast", "The Legend of Old Gregg", and "Tundra". The pair also appeared in live links throughout the night, in a similar style to the openings of Series 1 episodes.  On 23 December 2008, BBC3 held a Merry Booshmas Party featuring the entire series 3 as well as a broadcast of The Mighty Boosh Live.

Film
On 8 February 2012, whilst sledging, Noel Fielding said that he and Barratt had discussed plans to make a Mighty Boosh film. On New Year's Eve in 2019, Noel Fielding posted that there needs to be more Boosh in the following decade on his Instagram account.

Festival
On 5 July 2008, the Boosh held their own festival in the Hop Farm in Kent. It featured musical acts, Robots in Disguise, The Charlatans, The Kills, Gary Numan, and The Mighty Boosh Band, as well as comedy acts Frankie Boyle and Ross Noble.

Media

Audio CDs

According to an official MySpace page for PieFace Records (the fictitious music label mentioned throughout the series), Barratt and Fielding are to release an album of music from the show, "along with extras, versions, remixes and rare unreleased stuff all to be released later in the year on their own label—this one". In interviews since, The Mighty Boosh have confirmed they will be releasing an album of their music. On 21 October 2013 episode of Never Mind the Buzzcocks, Fielding stated that the Boosh have recorded an album, but don't know when it will be released.

DVDs

Previously most of the DVDs were only released in Region 2 but as a result of a growing fan base in the U.S., the BBC rereleased in Region 1, Series 1–3 individually on 21 July 2009, and a Special Edition Series 1–3 Boxset on 13 October 2009.

Australian releases
Series One – 11 April 2007
Series Two – 12 April 2007
Series Three – 6 August 2008
Live – 3 December 2008
Special Edition – 6 August 2009
Future Sailors Tour – 10 November 2009
Series One: Episodes 1–3 (Comedy Bites) – 4 March 2010

Books
On 18 September 2008, Canongate Books published The Mighty Book of Boosh, designed and compiled by Dave Brown and written by Noel Fielding, Julian Barratt, Rich Fulcher, Dave Brown, Richard Ayoade and Michael Fielding.  The book includes original stories, crimps, concept art, behind-the-scenes photography, comics, and various other things, featuring old and new Mighty Boosh characters. On 1 October 2009, a paperback version was released under the name The Pocket Book of Boosh.

Awards
Particularly popular among followers of the indie and electro music genres catered to by NME magazine, The Mighty Boosh has been recipient of the Shockwaves NME Awards Best TV Show for three consecutive years, even though there were no new episodes broadcast for the latter two of the three years.

References

External links

 "The Mighty Boosh PBJ Page"
 BBC Mighty Boosh Mighty Boosh at the BBC
 UKTV Mighty Boosh Mighty Boosh at UKTV
 

 
British comedy troupes
British surrealist artists
Surrealist groups
Comedy collectives
Narcissism in fiction